Paraptila gamma is a species of moth of the family Tortricidae. It is found in Mexico (Tabasco) and Costa Rica.

The length of the forewings is 6.5–7 mm for males and 10 mm for females. The ground colour of the forewings is dark red brown in the basal area, followed by a pale brown band. There is a silver-white patch bordering the costa, bordered distally and basally by darker red brown. The hindwings are white with uniform light grey-brown overscaling.

References

Moths described in 1914
Euliini